Theropithecus darti is an extinct species of Theropithecus from the middle to late Pliocene of Africa.

References

Papionini
Pliocene mammals of Africa
Taxa named by Robert Broom
Fossil taxa described in 1946
Pliocene primates